Larri Leeger (born October 30, 1986) is a Swiss-Finnish professional ice hockey defenceman. He is currently playing with EHC Olten in the Swiss League (SL) on loan from the SCL Tigers of the National League (NL).

Leeger made his National League A debut playing with ZSC Lions during the 2006–07 NLA season.

Early life
Leeger was born in Switzerland to a Finnish mother and a Swiss father. He holds dual citizenship of Finland and Switzerland.

References

External links

1986 births
Living people
People from Bülach
HC Fribourg-Gottéron players
Genève-Servette HC players
Lausanne HC players
EHC Olten players
SCL Tigers players
Swiss ice hockey players
Finnish ice hockey defencemen
ZSC Lions players
EV Zug players
Finnish people of Swiss descent
Swiss people of Finnish descent
Sportspeople from the canton of Zürich